Annelies Bredael (born 15 June 1965 in Willebroek, Antwerp) is a Belgian rower. She participated in 3 consecutive Summer Olympics in Seoul, Barcelona and Atlanta In 1992, she won the silver medal in rowing, single scull at the Summer Olympics in Barcelona.

References

1965 births
Living people
Belgian female rowers
Rowers at the 1988 Summer Olympics
Rowers at the 1992 Summer Olympics
Rowers at the 1996 Summer Olympics
Olympic rowers of Belgium
Olympic silver medalists for Belgium
Sportspeople from Antwerp Province
Olympic medalists in rowing
People from Willebroek
Medalists at the 1992 Summer Olympics
World Rowing Championships medalists for Belgium
20th-century Belgian women